The history of canals in China connecting its major rivers and centers of agriculture and population extends from the legendary exploits of Yu the Great in his attempts control the flooding of the Yellow River to the present infrastructure projects of the People's Republic of China. From the Spring and Autumn period (8th–5th centuriesBCE) onward, the canals of China were used for army transportation and supply, as well as colonization of new territories. From the Qin (3rd century BCE) to the Qing (17th–20th centuriesCE), China's canal network was also essential to imperial taxation-in-kind. Control of shipbuilding and internal tariffs were also administered along the canals.

History

Spring and Autumn and Warring States periods
In 647BCE, the State of Jin suffered major crop failure. Duke Mu of Qin despatched a large fleet of ships manned by Corvée labour from his capital at Yong (雍) in modern-day Fengxiang County, Shaanxi Province. The ships carried several thousands of tons of cereal and proceeded along the Wei, Yellow and Fen Rivers before arriving at the Jin capital Jiang (绛) (south east of modern-day Yicheng County, Shanxi Province).
Later, in 486BCE, King Fuchai of Wu linked the Yangtze and Huai Rivers by excavating the Han Ravine (邗沟) so that water flowed from the Yangtze through the Lakes Fanliang (樊梁湖), Bozhi (博芝湖) and Sheyang (射阳湖) into the Wei at Huai'an. This waterway was subsequently used to transport provisions for the army. Three years afterwards King Fuchai further extended the Han Ravine via the Heshui Canal (荷水运河) to connect with the Si River in Shandong Province.

Qin dynasty
In 214BCE the first Chinese Emperor Qin Shi Huang ordered the construction of a canal connecting the Xiang River and the Lijiang in order to supply his troops for an attack on the Xiongnu nomads. Designed by Shi Lu (史祿), the resulting Lingqu Canal is the oldest contour canal in the world. This canal along with the Zhengguo Canal in Shaanxi Province and the Dujiangyan Irrigation System in Sichuan Province are known as “The three great hydraulic engineering projects  of the Qin dynasty”.

Han dynasty
During the Chu–Han Contention (206–202BCE), General Xiao He used the Wei River to transport provisions for his army, thereby creating an effective logistics supply network. In 129BCE, the sixth year of Emperor Wu, a canal was cut through the northern foothills of the Qin Mountains running parallel to the Wei River linking Tong Pass with Chang’an and greatly reducing the amount of time needed to transport goods between the two cities.

Sui and Tang dynasties
Although the Sui dynasty lasted only 37 years from 581 until 618, its rulers made a major contribution to improving the canal system. The Grand Canal became a major factor in economic growth and political unity by connecting north and south, allowing transport of tax grain and control of the sale of salt. The Hai, Yellow, Huai, Yangtze and Qiantang Rivers were all interlinked through the construction of canals thus laying the groundwork for further development during later dynasties. These were the Guangtong Canal (廣通渠), Tongji Canal (通濟渠), Shanyang Channel (山陽瀆) and Yongji Canal (永濟渠) which formed the basis of a large scale canal based transport network. 
At the time of Emperor Jingzong of Tang (r. 824–827) the canal system had become too shallow. This restricted the movement of salt and iron which were important government monopolies so to solve the problem seven rivers were diverted to the east.

Song dynasty
During the Song dynasty the capital Daliang (大梁), modern day Kaifeng, used the Bian Yellow, Huimin (惠民河) and Guangji (广济河) Rivers as part of the canal network. In 976 CE during the reign of Emperor Taizong of Song more than 55 million bushels of grain were moved along the Bian River to the capital. By the time of Emperor Renzong of Song (r. 1022–763) the amount had increased to 80 million bushels.

Yuan dynasty
The Yuan Dynasty saw the establishment of a government body in the form of a "Si" (司) near the capital to oversee the canal system. Known as the Huai & Yangtze Rivers Grain Transport Office, (江淮都漕运司) this was an offshoot of the Three Departments and Six Ministries of the administrative third grade or "San Pin" (三品). This office was responsible for arranging grain transportation to the Luan River (滦河) then onwards to the capital at Dadu (modern day Beijing) using more than 3,000 boats. Sea-based transportation within the grain taxation system was also important with canals playing a subsidiary role.

Ming dynasty

In 1368, the first year of the reign of the Ming Hongwu Emperor, the Capital Grain Transport Office (京畿都漕运司) was established under the auspices of a fourth grade (四品) commissioner. At the same time, the canal system's governor-general's office was set up in the prefectural capital of Huai'an, Jiangsu Province. Its responsibilities were to manage the canal network and ensure that annual grain shipments remained at around 40 million tons. Boatyards were also established in Anqing, Suzhou, Hangzhou, Jiujiang, Zhangshu and Raozhou (饶州) (modern day Poyang County). Overall responsibility for all these locations lay with a department of the Ministry of Works.
Every year, regulations fixed the total amount of tax payable by the entire country in grain via the canal system at 29.5 million bushels. Of this, 12 million bushels were allocated to local governments, 8 million bushels supported the army on the northern border, 1.2 million bushels went to the capital in Nanjing whilst 8.2 million bushels were used to supply Beijing.

From 1415 onwards, imperial regulations stated that the grain taxation system should use only the country's canal network; thereafter all seaborne transportation stopped. This situation remained virtually unchanged until the beginning of the 19th century and as a result, during both the Ming and Qing Dynasties, the volume of the grain tax transported via the Grand Canal far exceeded that of the preceding Yuan Dynasty.

During the Ming dynasty the usage pattern of the canal system went through three successive phases. At first the "zhiyun" (支运) variant evolved as grain tax transportation switched from the sea to the country's canal and river network. At Huai’an, Xuzhou, Linqing and other locations, warehouses were established to store taxes paid in grain and delivered by the local population. This was then shipped north to provision the army once every quarter. Storage became unnecessary with the advent of the "duiyun" (兑运) form where taxes paid by the common people were partly used to directly pay the transportation fees for army supplies on the journey north. During the third stage known as "changyun" (长运) or "gaidui" (改兌), the army took responsibility for the movement of grain from south of the Yangtze River.

According to Ming dynasty scholar Qiu Jun (邱濬): “Use of the river and canal network saved 30–40% of costs compared to road transportation whereas the savings achieved using sea-borne transport were 70%–80%.”

Qing dynasty

Although the Qing dynasty continued to use the existing canal system it had numerous disadvantages and caused the government many headaches. In 1825 during the reign of the Daoguang Emperor a maritime shipping office was established in Shanghai with a grain tax receiving station at Tianjin. Qishan and other senior ministers thereafter managed the first grain shipments by sea. Operations in Tianjin quickly grew to outstrip those based in Linqing, Shandong Province. Before the First Opium War of 1839–42 and the Second Opium War (1856–60), yearly grain-tax maritime shipments reached around 4 million bushels of grain per annum.

A series of events towards the end of the Qing dynasty led to the ultimate decline of the canal system:
 On the 21July 1842, during the later stages of the First Opium War, British troops attacked and occupied Zhenjiang near the confluence of the Grand Canal and Yangtze River, effectively blocking operation of the canal system and its grain taxes. As a result, the Qing Daoguang Emperor decided to sue for peace and agreed to sign the Treaty of Nanking which brought hostilities to an end.
 The Taiping Rebellion of 1850–64 resulted in the loss of Nanjing and the Anhui segment of the Yangtze River for ten years from 1853 onwards thereby curtailing the canal network. During the war with the rebels, major canal side towns including Yangzhou, Qingjiangpu (清江浦), Linqing, Suzhou and Hangzhou suffered serious damage or were razed to the ground.
After the Yellow River changed course in its floods between 1851 and 1855, the canals in the Shandong region gradually silted up. Thereafter, the principal routes for grain shipment were maritime.
In 1872, an office to promote investment in steamships was established in Shanghai when steamships became the official vessels used within the grain-tax system.
All canal-based traffic of the grain tax ceased in 1901.
The post of canal system's governor-general was abolished in 1904
1911 saw the opening of the Jinpu railway linking Tianjin and Zhenjiang such that the importance of the Grand Canal and the towns along its banks significantly dropped.

People's Republic

During the Great Leap Forward, the Red Flag Canal was built entirely by hand as an irrigation canal diverting water from the Zhang River to fields in Linzhou in northern Henan. It was celebrated within China and was the subject of several movies, including a section of Michelangelo Antonioni's 1972 documentary Chung Kuo.

The South–North Water Transfer Project is still ongoing, with the central route completed in 2014.

References

Further reading
 . 
 . 
 . 

Canals
Canals